Dennis F. Driscoll  (October 10, 1862 - February 21, 1901) was a Major League Baseball player. He played for the 1885 Buffalo Bisons.

Sources

Major League Baseball second basemen
Buffalo Bisons (NL) players
Baseball players from Providence, Rhode Island
1862 births
1901 deaths
19th-century baseball players